This is the list of songs which reached number one on the Rhythmic chart in Billboard magazine during the 2020s.

Number-one rhythmic hits of the 2020s
↓↑ – Song's run at number one was non-consecutive
 – Number-one rhythmic song of the year

See also
2020s in music
List of Billboard Hot 100 number-one singles of the 2020s

References 

United States Rhythmic
Lists of number-one songs in the United States
2020s in American music